The Trinidad and Tobago women's national basketball team is the women's national basketball team of Trinidad and Tobago. It is managed by the National Basketball Federation of Trinidad and Tobago (NBFTT).

Trinidad and Tobago won the silver medal at the 2011 CBC Championship for Women.

See also 
 Trinidad and Tobago women's national under-19 basketball team
 Trinidad and Tobago women's national under-17 basketball team
 Trinidad and Tobago women's national 3x3 team

References

External links
Official website
Trinidad and Tobago Basketball Records at FIBA Archive
Latinbasket.com - Trinidad and Tobago Women National Team

Women's national basketball teams
Basketball in Trinidad and Tobago
Basketball teams in Trinidad and Tobago
B